A 'Splice' is an Australian ice cream confectionery consisting of ice cream encased in frozen fruit flavoured ice. A wooden stick is set into the ice cream for ease of consumption. The Splice is manufactured by Unilever under the Streets brand name. The Splice is available in Australia and New Zealand.

History
Released in Australia in 1962 by Streets, the Splice remains a popular ice confectionery. It has inspired imitators including the 'Splits' marketed by Bulla and a cocktail.

Australian airline Qantas began serving Pine Lime Splices in-flight in 2009.

Product information
Streets currently markets two varieties of Splice: the original Pine Lime and   Raspberry (introduced in the early 1990s). Mango was produced in the early 2000s. The wrapper is labelled, "FRUIT ICE CONFECTION (63%) WITH REDUCED FAT ICE CREAM (37%)".

References

Ice cream brands
Unilever brands
Australian brands